The 1994 Kensington and Chelsea Council election took place on 5 May 1994 to elect members of Kensington and Chelsea London Borough Council in London, England. The whole council was up for election and the Conservative party stayed in overall control of the council.

Background

Election result

Ward results

References

1994
1994 London Borough council elections
20th century in the Royal Borough of Kensington and Chelsea